Charlevoix is a regional county municipality in the Capitale-Nationale region of Quebec, Canada. The seat is Baie-Saint-Paul.

Subdivisions
There are 7 subdivisions within the RCM:

Cities & Towns (1)
 Baie-Saint-Paul

Municipalities (3)
 L'Isle-aux-Coudres
 Les Éboulements
 Petite-Rivière-Saint-François

Parishes (2)
 Saint-Hilarion
 Saint-Urbain

Unorganized Territory (1)
 Lac-Pikauba

Transportation

Access routes
Highways and numbered routes that run through the municipality, including external routes that start or finish at the county border:

 Autoroutes
 None

 Principal Highways
 

 Secondary Highways
 
 

 External Routes
 None

See also
 List of regional county municipalities and equivalent territories in Quebec

References

 
Baie-Saint-Paul